Senator Washburn' may refer to:

Members of the United States Senate

William B. Washburn (1820–1887), U.S. Senator from Massachusetts from 1874 to 1875== also served in the Massachusetts State Senate
William D. Washburn (1831–1912), U.S. Senator from Minnesota from 1889 to 1895

United States state senate members
Charles G. Washburn (1857–1928), Massachusetts State Senate
Emory Washburn (1800–1877), Massachusetts State Senate
Ganem W. Washburn (1823–1907), Wisconsin State Senate
Reuel Washburn (1793–1878), Maine State Senate
Robert M. Washburn (1868–1946), Massachusetts State Senate

See also
Senator Ashburn (disambiguation)